Charter Oak is a census-designated place (CDP) in Los Angeles County, California, approximately  east of downtown Los Angeles.  The population was 9,310 at the 2010 census, up from 9,027 at the 2000 census.

Charter Oak is located in the eastern San Gabriel Valley, situated along Arrow Highway in between Covina to the south, Glendora to the north and San Dimas to the east.  Residents tend to refer to the CDP portion as the "unincorporated part of Covina", or simply as "Covina".

Originally a small agricultural town (primarily citrus orchards) centered on the intersection of Arrow Highway and Bonnie Cove Avenue, population growth greatly expanded the area recognized as "Charter Oak".  Since the 1960s, it has been known as a "bedroom community" suburb of Los Angeles and commercial agriculture is nearly gone.

Today, the generally accepted boundaries of historical Charter Oak are I-210 to the north, Valley Center Avenue to the east, Covina Hills Road to the south and Grand Avenue to the west, corresponding to the boundaries of Charter Oak Unified School District. However, the actual CDP area is notably smaller in the present day.

Geography
Charter Oak is located at  (34.101308, -117.857656).

Charter Oak is primarily flat ground, though the South Hills of Glendora form much of the northern border, and there is a small valley in the southeast quadrant, with Walnut Creek flowing in the bottom.  The other major water feature in Charter Oak is the San Dimas Wash, a concrete-lined flood control channel which was formerly the San Dimas River, a tributary of the San Gabriel River.  Both Walnut Creek and San Dimas wash flow from east-northeast toward west-southwest, the wash in Glendora and the creek in Covina.

The ground is described as "dry riverbed," with sandy soil which was suitable not only for the citrus orchards which once were the primary industry in the area, but also for several nurseries growing cactus and other small plants.

Education and culture
The area is served by the Charter Oak Unified School District, as well as numerous private schools.  The boundaries of the Charter Oak Unified School District, formed in areas which were at the time unincorporated area, eventually became the accepted boundaries of historical Charter Oak, attesting to the importance of the district in the community.

Community college students from Charter Oak generally attend Citrus College in Glendora or Mount San Antonio College ("Mount SAC") in Walnut.

Charter Oak Gymnastics has been a U.S. National Team training center since 1989, and has produced many elite athletes, including national champion Vanessa Atler and Olympian Jamie Dantzscher.

Demographics

2010
At the 2010 census Charter Oak had a population of 9,310. The racial makeup of Charter Oak was 5,602 (60.2%) White (34.0% Non-Hispanic White), 405 (4.4%) African American, 85 (0.9%) Native American, 1,035 (11.1%) Asian, 18 (0.2%) Pacific Islander, 1,693 (18.2%) from other races, and 472 (5.1%) from two or more races. Hispanic or Latino of any race were 4,546 persons (48.8%).

The census reported that 9,178 people (98.6% of the population) lived in households, 132 (1.4%) lived in non-institutionalized group quarters, and no one was institutionalized.

There were 3,044 households, 1,264 (41.5%) had children under the age of 18 living in them, 1,486 (48.8%) were opposite-sex married couples living together, 553 (18.2%) had a female householder with no husband present, 226 (7.4%) had a male householder with no wife present.  There were 188 (6.2%) unmarried opposite-sex partnerships, and 19 (0.6%) same-sex married couples or partnerships. 601 households (19.7%) were one person and 203 (6.7%) had someone living alone who was 65 or older. The average household size was 3.02.  There were 2,265 families (74.4% of households); the average family size was 3.47.

The age distribution was 2,352 people (25.3%) under the age of 18, 990 people (10.6%) aged 18 to 24, 2,601 people (27.9%) aged 25 to 44, 2,446 people (26.3%) aged 45 to 64, and 921 people (9.9%) who were 65 or older.  The median age was 35.4 years. For every 100 females, there were 94.6 males.  For every 100 females age 18 and over, there were 90.7 males.

There were 3,144 housing units at an average density of 3,388.7 per square mile, of the occupied units 1,998 (65.6%) were owner-occupied and 1,046 (34.4%) were rented. The homeowner vacancy rate was 1.5%; the rental vacancy rate was 4.0%.  6,168 people (66.3% of the population) lived in owner-occupied housing units and 3,010 people (32.3%) lived in rental housing units.

According to the 2010 United States Census, Charter Oak had a median household income of $68,597, with 8.3% of the population living below the federal poverty line.

2000
At the 2000 census there were 9,027 people, 3,048 households, and 2,255 families in the CDP. The population density was 9,711.3 inhabitants per square mile (3,747.7/km). The racial makeup of the CDP was 65.30% White, 4.77% Black or African American, 1.27% Native American, 9.19% Asian, 0.14% Pacific Islander, 14.02% from other races, and 5.28% from two or more races.  36.58% of the population were Hispanic or Latino of any race.
Of the 3,048 households 40.8% had children under the age of 18 living with them, 50.2% were married couples living together, 18.1% had a female householder with no husband present, and 26.0% were non-families. 19.8% of households were one person and 6.6% were one person aged 65 or older.  The average household size was 2.95 and the average family size was 3.41.

The age distribution was 29.6% under the age of 18, 9.4% from 18 to 24, 32.1% from 25 to 44, 20.6% from 45 to 64, and 8.3% 65 or older.  The median age was 33 years. For every 100 females, there were 95.3 males.  For every 100 females age 18 and over, there were 91.1 males.

The median household income was $50,744 and the median family income  was $55,294. Males had a median income of $37,153 versus $30,703 for females. The per capita income for the CDP was $18,766.  About 5.9% of families and 7.5% of the population were below the poverty line, including 9.4% of those under age 18 and 7.5% of those age 65 or over.

Government

References

Communities in the San Gabriel Valley
Census-designated places in Los Angeles County, California
Census-designated places in California